Čeněk of Oybin was a Czech nobleman, landowner, and founder of the .

Biography
Čeněk was born to the prominent Ronov family, though the date of his birth remains unknown. He first appears in the record in 1290 at Oybin. He was later mentioned in documents from the royal court of Prague in 1296 with his brother, Henry of Lipá. 

Čeněk built the castle at Sloup v Čechách, which was first mentioned in 1324. He used stones reminiscent of the ones used for building . Sloup Castle, known as Perkenstein or Pirkštejn, became his main seat and was integrated into his family name.

Čeněk acquired other estates in Moravia by marrying Jitka of Honcovice. The last time he was mentioned is in the will of his nephew , documented in 1346. Pertold bequeathed his uncle the farm and castle of Račice (part of modern day Račice-Pístovice) in Moravia.

Notes

References

Medieval Bohemian nobility
14th-century Bohemian people
Date of birth unknown